Robert John Wilder, Jr. (c. 1921 – 22 May 1953), was a native of Massachusetts, who was an American racing driver who competed in the SCCA National Sports Car Championships between 1951 and 1953.

Career

Wilder served 18 months in the United States Air Force during World War II and had raced since being discharged. His most notable results was a third place in the 1953 12 Hours of Sebring, taking a class win, when he partnered Sherwood Johnston, in a Jaguar C-Type. The season before, he was seventh in the overall SCCA National Sports Car Championship standings, after winning Climb to the Clouds, at the Mount Equinox, and the Burke Mountain Hill Climb, setting hill climbing records in the process.

Historically, Bob and Rowland Keith who were co-drivers on the 1950 Six Hours of Sebring endurance race, were shown as Canadians, as a result of driving a car from a Canadian dealer, despite Bob being the entrant. The pair finished 14th in their MG TC.

Death

On 22 May 1953, the Chicago Tribune reported that Wilder was killed when his Allard J2X Le Mans went out of control during a practice session for the Bridgehampton Sports Car Races. The car struck a depression in the road after crossing a bridge at high speed and rolled over. He was strapped in with a safety belt. His head was crushed.

Racing record

Career highlights

Complete 12 Hours of Sebring results

References

1920s births
1953 deaths
12 Hours of Sebring drivers
World Sportscar Championship drivers
Racing drivers from Massachusetts
Racing drivers who died while racing
Sports deaths in New York (state)